Birds of a Feather: A Tribute to Charlie Parker is a studio album by Roy Haynes released in 2001 from Dreyfus Jazz.
It received Grammy Award nominations in Best Jazz Instrumental Album.

Track listing

Personnel 
Musicians
Roy Haynes – drums
Kenny Garrett – alto saxophone
Roy Hargrove – trumpet
Dave Holland - bass
David Kikoski – piano

Production
Roy Haynes – producer
Don Sickler – producer
Alan Bergman – executive producer
Douglas Yoel – executive producer

Troy Halderson – engineer
Gene Paul – engineer (mastering)
Jim Anderson – engineer (mixing)
27.12 Design Ltd. – design
Ching Ming Cheung – photography

References

External links 
Roy HAYNES: Birds Of A Feather (Dreyfus Jazz)

Dreyfus Records albums
Roy Haynes albums
2001 albums